Stéphane Rossetto (born 6 April 1987 in Melun) is a French cyclist, who currently rides for UCI Continental team . He is notable for his long range final stage win from  out in the 2018 Tour de Yorkshire which also gave him the Mountains classification. In July 2019, he was named in the startlist for the 2019 Tour de France. In October 2020, he was named in the startlist for the 2020 Giro d'Italia.

Major results
Source: 

2005
 2nd Time trial, National Junior Road Championships
 3rd Chrono des Nations Juniors
2006
 1st Vienna Classic Espoirs
 1st Chrono Tauxigny
 3rd Chrono des Nations U23
 9th Chrono Champenois
2007
 1st Grand Prix de Beauchamps
 6th Chrono des Nations U23
 9th Chrono Champenois
2008
 1st Grand Prix de Lys-les-Lannoy
 7th Overall Tour de Gironde
2009
 1st  Overall Tour de Gironde
 3rd Boucles de la Marne
 8th Chrono Champenois
2011
 8th Overall Tour de la Manche
1st Stages 2 & 4
 9th Paris–Mantes-en-Yvelines
2012
 1st  Overall Tour des Pays de Savoie
1st Stage 1
 1st Trio Normand
 1st Stage 4 Circuit des Ardennes
 3rd Grand Prix Cristal Energie
 5th Time trial, National Road Championships
2013
 1st Stage 4 Tour du Limousin
 2nd Overall Tour du Gévaudan Languedoc-Roussillon
 5th Overall Tour de l'Ain
 9th Grand Prix de la Somme
2014
 1st  Overall Boucles de la Mayenne
 6th Overall Route du Sud
 7th Chrono des Nations
 8th Tour du Doubs
 9th Paris–Camembert
 9th Polynormande
2015
 2nd Time trial, National Road Championships
 3rd Overall Tour du Gévaudan Languedoc-Roussillon
 4th Overall Route du Sud
 4th Overall Tour de Yorkshire
 4th Chrono des Nations
2016
 5th Overall Tour of Austria
 8th Overall Route du Sud
 10th Overall Circuit de la Sarthe
 10th Chrono des Nations
2017
 4th Chrono des Nations
 9th Overall Tour du Gévaudan Languedoc-Roussillon
2018
 Tour de Yorkshire
1st  Mountains classification
1st Stage 4
 3rd Chrono des Nations
2019
 2nd Time trial, National Road Championships
  Combativity award Stage 1 Tour de France
2022
 6th Overall Tour Alsace
 10th Chrono des Nations

Grand Tour general classification results timeline

References

External links

Sportspeople from Melun
1987 births
Living people
French male cyclists
Cyclists from Île-de-France
20th-century French people
21st-century French people